Brancepeth is a hamlet in the Canadian province of Saskatchewan.

History 
The community is named for Brancepeth, County Durham, England.

Demographics 

References

Birch Hills No. 460, Saskatchewan
Designated places in Saskatchewan
Organized hamlets in Saskatchewan
Division No. 15, Saskatchewan